1951 Emperor's Cup Final was the 31st final of the Emperor's Cup competition. The final was played at Miyagino Football Stadium in Miyagi on May 27, 1951. Keio BRB won the championship.

Overview
Keio BRB with Yukio Tsuda and Hirokazu Ninomiya on the team won the championship, by defeating Osaka Club 3–2. Osaka Club was featured a squad consisting of Taro Kagawa, Toshio Iwatani and Taizo Kawamoto.

Match details

See also
1951 Emperor's Cup

References

Emperor's Cup
Emperor's Cup Final
Emperor's Cup Final